Mudhal Echarikkai is a 1999 Tamil language film directed by S. G. S. Devar and produced by G. Jothi. The film featured Ponnambalam, Karikalan and Vichithra in the leading roles, while Keerthana and Kavitha played supporting roles. The film, which had music composed by Manivannan, opened in December 1999.

Cast
Ponnambalam
Karikalan
Vichithra
Keerthana
S.Kavitha
Suryakanth
Pon Ramachandran
O. A. K. Sundar
K. S. Selvaraj
Raviraja
Ennatha Kannaiya

Release
The film was later dubbed and released in Telugu as Modati Hecharika.

References

1999 films
1990s Tamil-language films